The William Trent House is a historic building located at 15 Market Street in Trenton, Mercer County, New Jersey. It was built in 1719 for William Trent and is the oldest building in Trenton.  He founded the eponymous town, which became the capital of New Jersey. It has served as the residence for three Governors. The house was added to the National Register of Historic Places and listed as a National Historic Landmark on April 15, 1970, for its significance as an example of Early Georgian Colonial architecture.

Description
The lot is bounded by Market Street, an exit ramp of New Jersey Route 29, William Trent Place, and a parking lot serving the adjacent judicial facility. The house is a 2-1/2 story brick building, with a five-bay front facade and a hip roof crowned by a central cupola. Most windows are set in segmented-arch openings, with some butting against the dentillated cornice below the roof. The main entrance, a double door with a six-light transom window, is also set in a segmented-arch opening. The interior follows a central hall plan, with four chambers on each floor. Original surviving features include the main staircase, Dutch tiles in one of the fireplaces, and original woodwork in several rooms.

History
The house was built on land purchased in 1714 by William Trent (c. 1653—1724), a Scottish immigrant who came to Philadelphia in 1682.  The house was built as a summer house, but Trent moved in on a year-round basis in 1721, about the time he laid out the town that bears his name.  The house had numerous private owners until 1929, when it was given to the city by Edward C. Stokes.

During the summer of 1798, the federal government evacuated to Trenton to escape a yellow fever epidemic plaguing the temporary national capital, Philadelphia, Pennsylvania. Following Congress's adjournment in July (in Philadelphia), President John Adams spent the rest of the summer and most of the fall at his home in Quincy, Massachusetts. The Trent House housed federal offices until November, when the danger was deemed to have passed.

Recently, the building has been undergoing renovation including a new visitors center, funded by a grant from the New Jersey Historic Trust.  It serves as a historic house museum.

Gallery

See also 
 List of National Historic Landmarks in New Jersey
 National Register of Historic Places listings in Mercer County, New Jersey
 List of the oldest buildings in New Jersey
 List of museums in New Jersey

References

External links
Official site
 
 
 

National Historic Landmarks in New Jersey
Trent
Houses completed in 1719
Trent
Museums in Trenton, New Jersey
Trent
National Register of Historic Places in Trenton, New Jersey
Georgian architecture in New Jersey
1719 establishments in New Jersey
Historic American Buildings Survey in New Jersey
New Jersey Register of Historic Places